Crosato is a surname. Notable people with the surname include:

Giovanni Battista Crosato (1686–1758), Italian painter
Lisa Crosato, Australian opera soprano, musical theatre actor, and ballet dancer

See also
Rosato (surname)

Italian-language surnames